Podalonia luffii is a species of insect belonging to the family Sphecidae.

It is native to Europe.

References

Sphecidae